The 2009 Biante Touring Car Masters was an Australian motor racing series for pre-1974 Touring Cars. It was the third annual Touring Car Masters series.

Group 1 was won by Gavin Bullas driving a Ford Mustang and Group 2 by Trevor Talbot driving a Holden LJ Torana GTR XU-1.

Schedule

The series was contested over seven rounds.

Series standings

References

Touring Car Masters
Touring Car Masters